Sean Johnson (born 10 September 1972) is a New Zealand international lawn bowler.

Bowls career
Johnson played 99 times for his country and represented New Zealand in the 2002 Commonwealth Games in the lawn bowls competition. 

In 2004 he was part of the triples team with Rowan Brassey and Gary Lawson that won a silver medal at the 2004 World Outdoor Bowls Championship. He just missed out on a second medal in the fours after losing to England 18–17 in the bronze medal play off.

He won four medals at the Asia Pacific Bowls Championshipsincluding a gold medal, in the 2003 triples, in Brisbane.

He won the 2000 pairs title at the New Zealand National Bowls Championships when bowling for the Aramoho Bowls Club.

Awards
In 2013 he was inducted into the Wanganui Sports Hall of Fame in 2013.

References

Living people
1972 births
New Zealand male bowls players
Bowls players at the 2002 Commonwealth Games
Commonwealth Games competitors for New Zealand
20th-century New Zealand people
21st-century New Zealand people